The Old New Land (Tel Aviv, "Tel of spring") is a utopian novel published by Theodor Herzl, the founder of political Zionism, in 1902. It was published six years after Herzl's political pamphlet, Der Judenstaat (The Jewish State) and expanded on Herzl's vision for a Jewish return to the Land of Israel, which helped Altneuland become one of Zionism's establishing texts. It was translated into Yiddish by Israel Isidor Elyashev (Altnailand. Warsaw, 1902), and into Hebrew by Nahum Sokolow as Tel Aviv (also Warsaw, 1902), a name then adopted for the newly founded city.

Plot introduction
The novel tells the story of Friedrich Löwenberg, a young Jewish Viennese intellectual, who, tired with European decadence, joins an Americanized Prussian aristocrat named Kingscourt as they retire to a remote Pacific island (it is specifically mentioned as being part of the Cook Islands, near Rarotonga) in 1902. Stopping in Jaffa on their way to the Pacific, they find Palestine a backward, destitute and sparsely populated land, as it appeared to Herzl on his visit in 1898.

Löwenberg and Kingscourt spend the following twenty years on the island, cut off from civilization. As they stop over in Palestine on their way back to Europe in 1923, they are astonished to discover a land drastically transformed. A Jewish organization officially named the "New Society" has since risen as European Jews have rediscovered and re-inhabited their Altneuland, reclaiming their own destiny in the Land of Israel. The country, whose leaders include some old acquaintances from Vienna, is now prosperous and well-populated, boasts a thriving cooperative industry based on state-of-the-art technology, and is home to a free, just, and cosmopolitan modern society. Arabs have full equal rights with Jews, with an Arab engineer among the New Society's leaders, and most merchants in the country are Armenians, Greeks, and members of other ethnic groups. The duo arrives at the time of a general election campaign, during which a fanatical rabbi establishes a political platform arguing that the country belongs exclusively to Jews and demands non-Jewish citizens be stripped of their voting rights, but is ultimately defeated.

Major themes
Herzl's novel depicts his vision for the realization of Jewish national emancipation, as put forward in his book Der Judenstaat (The Jewish State) published in 1896. Both ideological and utopian, it presents a model society which was to adopt a liberal and egalitarian social model, resembling a modern welfare society. Herzl called his model "Mutualism" and it is based on a mixed economy, with public ownership of the land and natural resources, agricultural cooperatives, welfare, while at the same time encouraging private entrepreneurship. A true modernist, Herzl rejected the European class system, yet remained loyal to Europe's cultural heritage.

Rather than imagining the Jews in Altneuland as speaking mainly Hebrew, the society is multilingual. While the language question is not discussed in detail, it appears that Yiddish is the main vernacular language and German the main written language. European customs are reproduced, such as going to the opera and enjoying the theatre. While Jerusalem is the capital, with the seat of parliament ("Congress") and the Jewish Academy, the country's industrial center is the modern city of Haifa.

Herzl saw the potential of Haifa Bay for constructing a modern deep-water port. As envisioned by Herzl, "All the way from Acco to Mount Carmel stretched what seemed to be one great park".

Herzl's depiction of Jerusalem includes a rebuilt Jerusalem Temple. However, in his view, the Temple did not need to be built on the precise site where the old Temple stood and which is now taken up by the Muslim Al-Aqsa Mosque and Dome of the Rock - very sensitive holy sites. By locating the Temple at a different Jerusalem location, the Jewish state envisioned by Herzl avoids the extreme tension over this issue experienced in the actual Israel. Also, worship at the Temple envisioned by Herzl does not involve animal sacrifice, which was the main form of worship at the ancient Jerusalem Temple. Rather, the Temple depicted in Alteneuland is essentially just an especially big and ornate synagogue, holding the same kind of services as any other synagogue.  

The country envisioned in the book is not involved in any wars and does not maintain any armed forces. As explained in the book, the founders took care to get the consent of all European powers for their enterprise and not get entangled in any inter-power rivalry. As for the country's Arab inhabitants, the book's single Arab character, Rashid Bey, explains that the Arabs saw no reason to oppose the influx of Jews, who "developed the country and raised everybody's standard of living".

As noted in a lengthy flashback detailing, a Zionist Charter Company named "The New Society for the Colonization of Palestine" was able to get "autonomous rights to the regions which it was to colonize" in return for paying the Turkish Government £2,000,000 sterling in cash, plus £50,000 a year and one fourth of its net annual profits. In theory, "The ultimate sovereignty" remained "reserved to the Sultan"; in practice, however, the entire detailed description given in the book does not mention even the slightest vestige of an Ottoman administration or of any  Ottoman influence in the life of the country.

The territorial extent of the envisioned Old New Land is clearly far greater than that of the actual Israel, even including its 1967 conquests. Tyre and Sidon in the present Lebanon are among its port cities. Kuneitra - actually at the extreme end of the Golan Heights which Israel captured in 1967, and handed back to Syria in 1973 - was in Herzl's vision a prosperous way station on a railway extending much further eastwards, evidently controlled by "The New Society". In another reference are mentioned "the cities along the railway to the Euphrates - Damascus and Tadmor" (the latter a rebuilt Palmyra).

Having obtained the general concession from the Ottoman government, "The New Society" set out to buy up the land from its private owners. As depicted in the book, the sum of £2,000,000 was set aside to pay the land owners. A single agent traveled the land and within a few months secured to "The New Society" ownership of virtually its entire land area, evidently encountering no opposition and no unwillingness to sell.

Legacy

The book was immediately translated into Hebrew by Nahum Sokolow, who gave it the poetic title "Tel Aviv", using tel ('ancient mound') for 'old' and aviv ('spring') for 'new'. The name as such appears in the Book of Ezekiel, where it is used for a place in Babylonia to which the Israelites had been exiled. The Hebrew title of the book was chosen as the name for a new neighbourhood of Jaffa, established in 1909 under the uninspired name of "Ahuzat Bayit", lit. "Homestead". The new name, Tel Aviv, replaced the original one only a year later, in 1910, and was used for the expanded settlement, now comprising two more adjacent neighbourhoods. Eventually Tel Aviv would become known as "the first [modern] Hebrew city" and a central economic and cultural hub of Israel.

Herzl's friend Felix Salten visited Palestine in 1924 and saw how Herzl's dream was coming true. Next year, Salten gave his travel book the title Neue Menschen auf alter Erde (“New People on Old Soil”), and both the title of this book and its contents allude to Herzl's Altneuland.

Publication details
1902, Germany, Hermann Seemann Nachfolger, Leipzig, hardback (First edition) (as Altneuland in German)
1941, US, Bloch Publishing, hardback (translated by Lotta Levensohn)
1961, Israel, Haifa Publishing, paperback (as Altneuland in German)
1987, US, Random House, paperback
1997, US, Wiener (Markus) Publishing, paperback

References

External links
 
 Full text translation at Jewish Virtual Library
 Dreaming of Altneuland. The Economist, December 21, 2000.
 The Herzl Museum in Jerusalem

1902 science fiction novels
Austrian novels
Utopian novels
Books about Zionism
Novels set in Israel
20th-century Austrian novels
1902 German-language novels
Fiction set in 1923
Novels set in the future
Theodor Herzl